Shiblī Yousef Hamad al-Aysamī, alternatively also Shibli-L-Aʾysami, al-Ayasami, al-Ayssami or al-ʿAisamī, (5 February 1925 – June 4, 2011) Druze-Syrian politician and Arab nationalist figure. He was born to a Druze family in al-Suwayda, Syria. He was kidnapped by unknown persons in Aley, Lebanon and is presumed to be dead.

Political career

Syria
In 1947, together with Michel Aflaq, he became a founding member of the Arab Socialist Ba'ath Party and from 1963 to 1964 he held different ministerial posts in the Syrian government. In 1964 he was elected as General Secretary of the Syrian Regional Command of the Ba'ath Party and in 1965 he became Vice President of Syria under Amin al-Hafiz.

Iraq

Following the 1966 Syrian coup d'état which resulted in President al-Hafiz being overthrown and the creation of the Syrian-Iraqi rift, al-Aysami, then Vice President of Syria, fled to Iraq. In 1974 the Iraqi Branch of the Ba'ath Party installed a rival National Command of the Ba'ath Party with Michel Aflaq as General Secretary and al-Aysami as his deputy (until 1979).

In 1982 al-Hafiz and al-Aysami, together with Islamist, nationalist and leftist opposition groups founded the Iraqi-backed National Alliance for the Liberation of Syria, but in 1992 al-Aysami retired from political life. He remained in Iraq until the 2003 invasion of Iraq and fled to Egypt, then the United States and Yemen thereafter.

Kidnapping

On 4 June 2011, during a visit to Lebanon, al-Aysami was kidnapped by unknown militants and is presumed dead. His family accused the Syrian government of Bashar al-Assad for the kidnapping, after many witnesses came forth with evidence, however the Lebanese government was too weak to take measures against the Syrian government. The Syrian government, however, blamed the Lebanese Druze leader Walid Jumblatt.

Personal life
He was the great uncle of Tareck El Aissami, the former Vice President of Venezuela.

See also
List of kidnappings
List of people who disappeared

Bibliography

 Muhafazat al-Suwayad (1962)
 La révolution arabe (1971)
 Arab Unity through experience (Beirut, 1971)
 Unity, Freedom, Socialism (Madrid, 1976)
 Arabische Sozialistische Ba'th Partei: Die Gründungsperiode in den vierziger Jahren (Varese, 1977)

Further reading
 Itamar Rabinovič: Syria Under the Baʻth, 1963-66 - The Army Party Symbiosis. Tel Aviv/Jerusalem 1972

References

External links

Where is Shibli al-Ayssami?
Shibli al-Ayssami is in Syria, son says

1925 births
2010s missing person cases
2011 deaths
Syrian Druze
Kidnapped politicians
Kidnapped Syrian people
Members of the Regional Command of the Arab Socialist Ba'ath Party – Syria Region
Members of the National Command of the Ba'ath Party
Missing people
Missing person cases in Lebanon
Syrian anti-communists
Syrian Arab nationalists
Syrian expatriates in Iraq
Vice presidents of Syria